Exeter Traction Maintenance Depot (or Exeter TMD) is a railway Traction Maintenance Depot situated in Exeter, Devon, United Kingdom and is next to the city's main St Davids station. The depot is operated by Great Western Railway and has an allocation of diesel multiple units.

The first engine shed on the site opened in 1844 and had an allocation of locomotives until 1963. It was rebuilt in 1976 but a larger three-road maintenance building and staff accommodation was opened in 2021.

History

An engine shed was opened at Exeter by the Bristol and Exeter Railway when it opened the line to here in 1844. A second facility was added a few years later by the South Devon Railway and the two were combined under the Great Western Railway (GWR) in 1876. The Bristol and Exeter had been worked by the GWR until 1849 but then purchased its own locomotives. Temporary workshops for these were built at Exeter but a permanent facility at Bristol was opened in 1851.

When British Railways introduced new shed codes in 1950, Exeter-based locomotives carried an oval cast plate with the code '83C'. The last locomotives based here were sent elsewhere from 14 October 1963, but the shed area was kept as a fueling and stabling point for locomotives and diesel multiple units (DMUs) working in the area. From 29 December 1976 it was recognised as a depot again, even though no locomotives were allocated there at the time, and given a new code 'EX'. The shed was used for many years without a roof, but in 1980 a new covered maintenance area was built. New facilities were provided at the depot in 2011, including a new fueling point, and also jacks so that DMUs do not have to be sent empty to Bristol when they require lifting.

It was announced in January 2018 that £40 million was being invested into a new train maintenance depot at Exeter to allow expansion to the existing depot and fleet.' Completion was delayed due to engineering problems and the COVID-19 pandemic but was completed in 2021 having cost £56 million.

Description

The new depot building which opened in 2021 has a three-storey block accommodating staff and their facilities opposite platform 6 of St Davids station. Behind this is a three-road maintenance shed. Two roads can take a five-car train while the shorter road for three-car trains is equipped with lifting jacks and a crane. There are stabling sidings alongside the maintenance shed and the old 1980 shed. There is also a train wash and fuelling facilities

Allocation
In the 1920s there was a mixture of tank locomotives for local services and small tender engines for longer distance services. For example in 192 the were 35 locomotives (including 517 Class 0-4-2Ts, 1976 Class 0-6-0PTs, 2301 Class 0-6-0s, 4000 'Star' Class 4-6-0 and 4300 Class 2-6-0s) plus a single railmotor. The last steam locomotives were taken away in 1963.

The depot's fleet of DMUs at the start of 2010 comprised 74 coaches formed as:
 6 two-car  'Pacer' units
 8 two-car  'Pacer' units
 17 two-car  units
 12 single-car  units

The Class 142s had been based here since December 2007, on lease from Northern Rail. They were returned in November and December 2011 after second-hand Class 150/1 sets were received from London Midland. The Class 143s were transferred from St Philip's Marsh to Exeter in December 2008, but three  of the units worked in the Bristol area each day for several years on services on the Severn Beach Line and the Bristol to Taunton Line, returning to Exeter every other day for servicing.

By 2021 the fleet had become
 20 two-car  units
 11 two-car  units

See also
 Exmouth Junction – the London and South Western Railway shed in Exeter
 List of British Railways shed codes
 List of British Rail TOPS depot codes

References

Railway depots in England
Rail transport in Devon
Buildings and structures in Exeter